Joel Monaghan (born 22 April 1982) is an Australian former professional rugby league footballer who last played for the Castleford Tigers (Heritage № 962) in the Super League. An Australian international and New South Wales State of Origin representative  or er, he previously played in the NRL for the Canberra Raiders and the Sydney Roosters.

Background
Joel Monaghan was born in Canberra, Australian Capital Territory, Australia. Monaghan's junior development was influenced by National Rugby League coach Neil Henry who was Monaghan's coach at Erindale College, Canberra. While attending Erindale College, Monoghan played for the Australian Schoolboys team in 2000.

He is the younger brother of fellow rugby league player Michael Monaghan.

Playing career

National Rugby League
Monaghan made his NRL début in 2001 for Canberra against the Penrith Panthers in round 10 and spent four seasons with the club.

He debuted for the Sydney Roosters in round 2005, against the South Sydney Rabbitohs. He missed much of the 2006 season after injuring his knee in a trail match against the St George Dragons then suffering later hamstring injuries during the year. He had a successful 2007 season at the Roosters scoring 13 tries in 17 games.

In 2008, Monaghan returned to the Canberra Raiders for the 2008 season. He won the Mal Meninga Medal for the club's Player of the Year. In August 2008, Monaghan was named in the preliminary 46-man Kangaroos squad for the 2008 Rugby League World Cup, and in October 2008 he was selected in the final 24-man Australia squad. In the final, he made the mistake of tackling Lance Hohaia who was without the ball, which resulted in a penalty try, changing a two-point deficit to an 8-point deficit with only 10 minutes left.

After the end of the 2010 season, Monaghan was released from his contract with the Raiders at his request. His decision to leave the Raiders came after a photograph of him simulating a lewd act with a dog during Mad Monday celebrations was published on Twitter. The photograph was noted and discussed by media outlets around the world.

Super League
On 3 December 2010 it was announced that English Super League club Warrington Wolves had signed Monaghan on a one-year contract. There he joined his brother Michael Monaghan.

Monaghan was selected for the Exiles squad for the Rugby League International Origin Match against England at Headingley on 10 
June 2011.

Monaghan was selected for the 2011 Exiles squad by coach Brian McLennan however he was not selected to play.

He played in the 2012 Challenge Cup Final victory over the Leeds Rhinos at Wembley Stadium.

He played in the 2012 Super League Grand Final defeat by the Leeds Rhinos at Old Trafford.

He was the regular season's top try-scorer in 2014.

Castleford Tigers confirmed Monaghan's signing in October 2015. He joined the club on a two-year deal, seemingly in anticipation of Justin Carney's departure. Across his two seasons with the Tigers, Monaghan made 34 appearances and scored 13 tries.

References

External links

Statistics at nrl.com
Profile at raiders.com.au
Statistics at rugby-league.com

1982 births
Living people
Albury Thunder players
Australia national rugby league team players
Australian rugby league players
Canberra Raiders players
Castleford Tigers players
Country New South Wales Origin rugby league team players
Exiles rugby league team players
New South Wales Rugby League State of Origin players
Prime Minister's XIII players
Rugby league centres
Rugby league players from Canberra
Rugby league wingers
Sydney Roosters players
Warrington Wolves players